Miss Wales is a national beauty pageant in Wales.

Rules

Miss Wales is open to unmarried women from age 16 to age 24, and is organized by Vibe Models. Contestants must not have had children, must be British citizens and must reside in Wales. Winners are expected to support "Welsh issues, charities, or other good causes ".There is also a corresponding Mister Wales contest for men.

Miss World from Wales
In 1961, Rosemarie Frankland finished 1st runner-up at Miss Universe 1961, she then became the first Welsh woman to win Miss United Kingdom. In the same year, she became the first British woman to capture the Miss World crown.

1974's Miss Wales, Helen Morgan, achieved exactly the same feat as Rosemarie Frankland, when she finished as 1st runner-up at Miss Universe 1974, before going to win the Miss United Kingdom and Miss World titles. At Miss World however, she was dethroned only four days after her victory, when it was discovered that she was an unmarried mother (and thus ineligible). Morgan did not actually break any rules, as the rules only stated that the contestants must not be married and made no mention of motherhood.

Wales at Miss World since 1999
Wales has been taking part in the Miss World pageant directly since 1999, since devolution. The first woman to compete at Miss World as Miss Wales was Clare Daniels, who competed alongside Stephanie Norrie who was Miss Scotland. The Final Miss United Kingdom contest had already taken place earlier in the year, so at Miss World 1999, there was the unusual situation of a Miss UK competing along with the Miss Scotland and Miss Wales winners. Miss England and Miss Northern Ireland competed at the Miss World contest for the first time in 2000.

Since 1999, the highest placed contestant from the four constituent countries of the UK wins the Miss United Kingdom title. Three Welsh women have won. In 2004, Welsh Amy Guy became the only British woman to be named as one of the 15 semifinalists, after winning the fast track event Sports Competition, becoming the first contestant under the Miss Wales banner to advance to the semifinals. In 2008, Chloe-Beth Morgan won the Miss UK title. Shen then went on to competes as Miss UK at Miss International 2009 and placed as 2nd runner-up. In 2012, Sophie Moulds achieved the highest placement ever among the four constituent countries when she finished as 1st Runner-up. She also claimed both the Beach Fashion award and the Continental Queen of Europe title.

Titleholders
Colour key

1999–present
The winner of Miss Wales represents her country at Miss World. On occasion, when the winner does not qualify (due to age) for either contest, a runner-up is sent.

1961–1998

See also 
 Miss England
 Miss Northern Ireland
 Miss Scotland
 Miss United Kingdom
 Miss Universe Great Britain

References

External links
 The official Miss Wales homepage

Welsh awards
Beauty pageants in Wales
Annual events in Wales
Wales
Wales
Women in Wales

fr:Miss Pays de Galles